The Hauberg Mountains are a group of mountains of about  extent, located  north of Cape Zumberge and  south of the Sweeney Mountains in Palmer Land, Antarctica.

Discovered by the Ronne Antarctic Research Expedition (RARE), 1947–48, led by Finn Ronne, and named by him for John Hauberg, of Rock Island, Illinois, a contributor to the expedition.

References

Mountain ranges of Palmer Land